Səfikürd (also, Safikyurd and Safykyurd) is a village and municipality in the Goranboy Rayon of Azerbaijan.  It has a population of 3,998.

References 

Populated places in Goranboy District